Hit Abhilashi was a leader of Bharatiya Janata Party from Punjab, India. He was a cabinet minister of the state from 1977 to 1980.  He was killed by suspected militants in 1988. He was president of the Punjab chapter of the Bharatiya Janata Party when killed.

References

1988 deaths
People murdered in Punjab, India
Punjab, India MLAs 1977–1980
State cabinet ministers of Punjab, India
Bharatiya Jana Sangh politicians
Bharatiya Janata Party politicians from Punjab
Assassinated Indian politicians
Victims of the insurgency in Punjab
Year of birth missing
Victims of Sikh terrorism